Dunum may refer to:
Dunam, a unit of measurement of land area also spelled dunum
Dunum (Ireland), historic name of at least two places
 Dunum, Lower Saxony, a municipality in Germany